Scotten is a surname. Notable people with the surname include:

Robert M. Scotten (1891–1968), American diplomat
William E. Scotten (1904–1958), American diplomat

English-language surnames